The University of Mbandaka (UNIMBA) is a public university in the Democratic Republic of the Congo, in the province of Equateur, in the city of Mbandaka. At its creation, it was an extension of the University of Kinshasa, then called "University Centre of Mbandaka (C.U.M.)". As of 2012 it had 800 students in six faculties. Instruction is in French.

History
The university was created on 1 October 2004 as Mbandaka Center University (C.U.M.), extension of the University of Kinshasa, and became autonomous in 2010 following Ministerial order No. 157/MINESU/CABMIN/EBK/PK/2010 on 27 September 2010.

References
 Ministerial Decree No. 157/MINESU/CABMIN/EBK-PK-2010 September 27, 2010, on the empowerment of some extensions of the institutions of higher and university education (article 2 point 8)

Universities in the Democratic Republic of the Congo
Mbandaka
Educational institutions established in 2004
2004 establishments in the Democratic Republic of the Congo